Hernâni José da Rosa (born 3 February 1984), also known just as Hernâni, is a Brazilian former professional footballer who played as a central defender.

Career
Hernâni was born in Antônio Carlos. He signed for Korona Kielce in 2005; his previous Polish club was Górnik Zabrze.
In July 2011 Hernâni commenced a trial with West Ham United including being part of their pre-season tour in Switzerland.

Personal life
He received Polish citizenship on 27 January 2011.

References

External links
 

1984 births
Living people
Brazilian footballers
Association football defenders
Grêmio Foot-Ball Porto Alegrense players
Avaí FC players
Górnik Zabrze players
Korona Kielce players
Pogoń Szczecin players
Ekstraklasa players
I liga players
Brazilian expatriate sportspeople in Poland
Expatriate footballers in Poland
Naturalized citizens of Poland
Brazilian expatriate footballers
Glinik Gorlice players